James Hope-Johnstone, 3rd Earl of Hopetoun FRSE (23 August 1741 – 29 May 1816), known as Viscount Aithrie from 1742 to 1781, was a Scottish Representative Peer and military leader.

Life

Hopetoun was the son of John Hope, 2nd Earl of Hopetoun, and his first wife, Lady Anne Ogilvy, daughter of James Ogilvy, 5th Earl of Findlater. His many siblings and half siblings included his sister Lady Henrietta Hope.

Being set on a military career he spent from 1758 until 1764 as an Ensign (junior officer) in the British Army.

He succeeded to the earldom of Hopetoun on the death of his father in 1781. He was Lord-Lieutenant of Linlithgowshire from 1794 to 1816 and sat in the House of Lords as a Scottish Representative Peer from 1784 to 1790 and from 1794 to 1796.

In 1786 he was elected a Fellow of the Royal Society of Scotland. His proposers were John Walker, James Hutton and Henry Cullen.

In 1809 he was created Baron Hopetoun, of Hopetoun in the County of Linlithgow, in the Peerage of the United Kingdom, with remainder to the heirs male of his father. In 1792 Hopetoun succeeded de jure as fifth Earl of Annandale and Hartfell on the death of his great-uncle, although he never successfully claimed the title. He also inherited the Johnstone family estates and assumed this surname in addition to that of Hope.

He died in Hopetoun House on 29 May 1816.

Family

Lord Hopetoun married Lady Elizabeth Carnegie (d. 1793), daughter of George Carnegie, 6th Earl of Northesk, in 1766. They had five daughters. Lord Hopetoun survived Elizabeth by over twenty years and died in May 1816, aged 74. He was succeeded in the earldom of Hopetoun by his half-brother, John Hope. The claim to the earldom of Annandale and Hartfell passed to his eldest daughter Lady Anne, who married William Johnstone Hope.

His daughter Georgiana Hope-Johnstone (d. 1797) married Andrew Cochrane, youngest son of Thomas Cochrane, 8th Earl of Dundonald, in 1793; Cochrane added "Johnstone" to his name to become Andrew Cochrane-Johnstone. He had a checkered career in the military and Parliament that ended with his involvement in the Great Stock Exchange Fraud of 1814.

Hope-Johnstone's brothers-in-law included Charles Hope, Lord Granton, Henry Dundas, Viscount Melville and  Sir Patrick Murray of Ochtertyre.

References

Kidd, Charles, Williamson, David (editors). Debrett's Peerage and Baronetage (1990 edition). New York: St Martin's Press, 1990.

www.thepeerage.com

External links

1741 births
1816 deaths
Earls of Hopetoun
Lord-Lieutenants of West Lothian
James
Scottish representative peers
Earls of Annandale and Hartfell